Serang is a city and the capital of Banten province and was formerly also the administrative center of Serang Regency in Indonesia (the Regency's capital is now at Ciruas). The city is located towards the north of Banten province, on the island of Java.  Before Banten province was formed in 2000, Serang was part of West Java province.

Serang has a tropical rainforest climate, with no dry season month. It faces the Java Sea, which is home to Thousand Islands.

Serang had a population of 576,961 in the 2010 census, making it the third most populous city in the province of Banten. The 2020 Census gave a total of 692,101; the official estimate as at mid 2022 was 720,362. Serang is located approximately 15 km from the border of Jabodetabek and sometimes considered as amalgamated with Greater Jakarta.

Culture

Religion

The majority of people in Serang and Banten Province embrace Islam, but other religions coexist peacefully. Serang is often known as "kota santri" or the "city of pious people", due to the history as a traditional center of Islamic learning. The city hosts two of the major congregational mosques in Banten province, Ats-Tsauroh Great Mosque of Serang and Al-Bantani Grand Mosque, which hold the capacity of 2,500 and 10,000 worshippers respectively.

Language
Compared with the majority in Banten Province who speak the Sundanese language, in addition to Sundanese language. Some residents local people in Serang speak the Javanese language with a dialect similar to the Cirebon dialect of Javanese. The reason for this is that many Javanese migrants arrived in early 1527 to build the Banten Sultanate, and remained to form the base of today's population.

Transportation
The city is served by  station, operated by Indonesia's rail operator PT Kereta Api Indonesia.

The Tangerang–Merak Toll Road, part of the Trans-Java toll road, passes through the city of Serang.

The road to the proposed Sunda Strait Bridge would start in Serang, pass through Merak in neighboring Cilegon city to cross over the Sunda Strait to Sumatra.

Administrative districts
Serang was formerly a part of Serang Regency. On 2 November 2007, the status of Serang was changed into a municipality (kota madya) independent of the Regency. Since that time, Serang City becomes a semi-enclave within Serang Regency, as the city borders the regency in the south, east, and west, while it borders with Java Sea in the north.

The City of Serang is divided into six districts (kecamatan), tabulated below with their areas and their populations at the 2010 Census and the 2020 Census, together with the official estimates as at mid 2022. The table also includes the number of administrative villages (urban kelurahan) in each district, and its postal codes.

Climate
Serang has a tropical rainforest climate (Af) with heavy rainfall year-round. Rain gets noticeably heavier from December to March.

Emblem
The emblem of Serang consists of 
 A hexagon with an image of the gerbang Kaibon and a star.
 The streamer at the foot of the emblem contains the motto of Serang city, Kota Serang Madani ("Self-reliant Serang").

References

External links

 
(in Indonesian) List of Tours in Serang City, Banten
List of Subdistricts, Villages, and Postal Codes of the Serang City

 
Populated places in Banten
Provincial capitals in Indonesia